130 Children (Spanish: 130 Hermanos) is a 2022 Chilean-Costa Rican documentary film directed by Ainara Aparici (in her directorial debut) and written by Aparici & Susana Quiroz. It depicts a large family, starting with 7 members and ending with 130, raising 30-40 heart children per generation while the parents grow older.

Synopsis 
In San José, Costa Rica, Melba (65) and Víctor (70) have a constantly expanding family, with six biological children and over 130 foster children in the past 40 years. Despite their advancing age, the couple continues to embrace the challenges of raising a large family. Some of their children are now embarking on their own paths towards adulthood, while a new child is gradually integrating into this bustling home. Despite the adventures and difficulties that come with such a large family, it continues to grow and thrive.

Background story 
In 2010, the director Ainara Aparici began to travel around Latin America, she arrived in Costa Rica and there she met Melba and was impressed with her story and decided to make a film.

Release 
130 Children premiered on May 5, 2022 in Chilean theaters.

Campaign 
130 Children also inspired the team to create a foundation and a campaign called Acoger es, which seeks to promote and publicize the importance of foster families in Chile.

References

External links 

 

2022 films
2022 documentary films
Chilean documentary films
2022 directorial debut films
Costa Rican documentary films
2020s Spanish-language films
2020s Chilean films
Films set in Costa Rica
Films shot in Costa Rica
Films about old age
Films about adoption
Films about children